Yang Dezhi (January 13, 1911 – October 25, 1994) was a Chinese general and politician. He was senior military officer in the North China (or 5th) Field Army, a veteran of the Korean War and commander in China during the Sino–Vietnamese War.

Early life
Yang Dezhi was a native of Nanyangqiao in Liling County, Hunan Province, the son of a blacksmith. He worked as a miner at Anyuan Coal Mine near Pingxiang at the age of 16 (1926) and may have heard Mao Zedong speak during the 1927 strike organization efforts. He later joined a force that followed Mao to Changsha in the summer of 1927, and was defeated in that aborted uprising. Joining the CCP in 1928, Yang fought in the early battles around the Jinggang Mountains and was assigned to Lin Biao's 28th Regiment where he participated in battles in Jiangxi and Fujian in 1929. After 1932, Yang commanded the 1st Regiment, 1st Division under Lin and Nie Rongzhen during the Long March.

1930s
During the 1930s and 1940s, Yang commanded the 344th Brigade of the 115th Division; the 1st Column of the Field Army of the Shanxi-Hebei-Shandong-Henan Military Area; and the 2nd and 19th Army Groups of the Northern China Military District.

During the Second Sino-Japanese War, Yang studied at the Counter-Japanese University in 1937. In the late 1938 in southern Hebei, the 343rd Brigade joined Yang Yong's 68th Regiment to form the a unit known to the KMT as the Second Column of the Eighth Route Army, under the command of Yang Dezhi, with Yang Yong as his deputy and Su Zhenhua as political commissar. This 685th Regiment of the 344th Brigade would be Yang's main force in the Chi-Lu-Yu Military Region until the end of the Sino-Japanese war in 1945.

Civil War
Throughout 1946–48, Yang faced very strong Nationalist forces in the area between Beiping (not yet renamed Beijing), Tianjin and Manchuria. In August 1946, Yang and Xiao Ke retreated in the face of an onslaught by three reinforced Nationalist corps concentrated on the rail lines between Beiping and Shenyang. In April 1948, Yang commanded the 2nd Army (later redesignated the 19th) under the North China Military Region of Nie Rongzhen and Xu Xiangqian. His deputy was Geng Biao and the political commissar Luo Ruiqing.

The 19th Group Army, established in August 1947, brought together several officers who would take prominent roles in post-liberation China. Among these were Geng Biao, Luo Ruiqing, Yang Chengwu, Pan Zili and Yang Dezhi.

In the Spring of 1949, Yang's now 19th Army besieged Taiyuan, where Yang worked closely with Xu Xiangqian's 18th Army. Following that battle, Yang reinforced Peng Dehuai at Lanzhou and remained with him into Ningxia through 1949. Yang Dezhi established the Ningxia Military Control Committee and Commanded the local Military District as the Civil War drew to a close.

Korea
The outbreak of hostilities on the Korean peninsula led to Yang's 19th Army being pre-positioned in Shandong, where it was re-equipped with new Russian arms. Yang led the 19th Army, 1st Field Army, to reinforce Peng Dehuai's Chinese People's Volunteers (CPV) in Korea in February 1951 as Deputy Commander of the CPV.

Yang's forces participated in the fifth offensive against the ROK 1st Division and British 29th Brigade, destroying the Gloucester Battalion during the push toward Seoul. In May 1952, his forces were driven back from Chorwon and, suffering heavy casualties withdrew north for reinforcements from Yang Chengwu's 20th Army. Yang remained in Korea until 1955, and was overall commander of the CPV during 1954–55.

Regional commands
Yang studied at the Nanjing Advanced Military Institute after returning from Korea, graduating in 1958 and being named Commander of the Jinan Military Region, a post he would hold until the mid-1970s. Yang's first post-liberation assignment was as Shanxi Military District (MD, provincial) Commander. He later rose to command the Jinan Military Region (MR, September 1958-January 1974), Shandong MD (April 1971-January 1974), Wuhan Military Region (January 1974-January 1979) and Kunming Military Region (January 1979-February 1980).

Sino Vietnam War 1979
Yang Dezhi served as the commander-in-chief commanding the war actions in Yunnan direction against Vietnam in early 1979.

National Office
Yang took over from Deng Xiaoping as PLA Chief-of-Staff in February 1980, joined the standing committee of the CCP Military Affairs Commission and was named a Vice Minister of National Defense a month later. He was a member of the 11th and 12th politburos, 1977–87.

Yang Dezhi was awarded the rank of General in 1955, and served as an Alternate Member of the 8th Central Committee (1956–69). He was elevated to full membership at the 9th CC in 1969 and retained that status through the 12th CC (1982–87), where he served as a Full Politburo member. General Yang also served on the CC Secretariat, February 1980-September 1982, and on the Military Affairs Committee, from 1980 to 1987. He was Vice Minister of National Defence during much of the 1980s.

General Yang Dezhi retired from his party and military posts in November 1987, together with Marshals Xu Xiangqian and Nie Rongzhen, Defense Minister Zhang Aiping and General Political Department Director Yu Qiuli.

During the Tiananmen Square protests of spring 1989, Yang Dezhi joined former Minister of Defense Zhang Aiping and five other retired generals in opposing the enforcement of martial law by the Army in Beijing.

The Three Yangs

There are several photos of  three generals surnamed Yang, and together with their service records and official writings, it appears that Generals Yang Dezhi, Yang Yong and Yang Chengwu were particularly close comrades in arms. When Yang Chengwu was political commissar of the 1st Division, Yang Dezhi was commander of the 2nd Division and Yang Yong was political commissar of the 4th Division, all in the 1st Front Army. A decade or so later, Yang Dezhi commanded the 19th Army Group, Yang Chengwu the 20th and Yang Yong the 5th, all in the 2nd Field Army. In Korea, the three fought together as well.

See also
 List of officers of the People's Liberation Army

References

1911 births
1994 deaths
People's Liberation Army generals from Hunan
Governors of Shandong
Chinese Communist Party politicians from Hunan
Politicians from Zhuzhou
People's Republic of China politicians from Hunan
Members of the Secretariat of the Chinese Communist Party
People's Liberation Army Chiefs of General Staff
Commanders of the Shaanxi Military District
Commanders of the Kunming Military Region
Commanders of the Wuhan Military Region
Commanders of the Jinan Military Region
Members of the 12th Politburo of the Chinese Communist Party
Deputy Ministers of National Defense of the People's Republic of China
Burials at Babaoshan Revolutionary Cemetery